The following persons have served as Master of Pembroke College, Cambridge:

References

 http://www.british-history.ac.uk/report.aspx?compid=66645

Masters
Pembroke